Civettictis is a genus of viverrid that contains the extant African civet (Civettictis civetta) and a recently described extinct relative from the Plio-Pleistocene of South Africa known as Civettictis braini.

Evolution
A 2006 phylogenetic study showed that the African civet is closely related to the genus Viverra. It was estimated that the Civettictis-Viverra clade diverged from Viverricula around 16.2 Mya; the African civet split from Viverra 12.3 Mya. The authors suggested that the subfamily Viverrinae should be bifurcated into Genettinae (Poiana and Genetta) and Viverrinae (Civettictis, Viverra and Viverricula). The following cladogram is based on this study.

References

Mammal genera
Mammal genera with one living species
Taxa named by R. I. Pocock
Viverrids